Vitellariopsis cuneata is a species of plant in the family Sapotaceae. It is endemic to Tanzania.

References

Flora of Tanzania
cuneata
Vulnerable plants
Taxonomy articles created by Polbot
Taxa named by André Aubréville
Taxa named by Adolf Engler